Spheres 2 is the eighth studio album by Canadian industrial/electronic music group Delerium in 1994.

Track listing
"Morphology" – 9:28
"TransHumanist" – 10:11
"Shockwave" – 8:33
"Dimensional Space" – 5:27
"Hypoxia" – 8:50
"Otherworld" – 4:49
"In Four Dimensions" – 12:31

Other
"In Four Dimensions" samples heavily from 1+2 by Recoil.

References

Delerium albums
1994 albums
Albums produced by Rhys Fulber